Sir John Coxe Hippisley, 1st Baronet (c. February 1746 – 3 May 1825), was a British diplomat and politician who pursued an 'unflagging, though wholly unsuccessful, quest for office' which led King George III of Great Britain to describe him as 'that busy man' and 'the grand intriguer'.

Early life and overseas appointments

Born John Cox Hipsley in Bristol in 1746, he was the son of William Hipsley, a haberdasher, and Ann Webb.  His middle name derived from his paternal grandmother, Dorothy Cox.  He was educated at Bristol Grammar School and at Hertford College, Oxford, becoming a Doctor of Civil Law in 1776.  He became a student at the Inner Temple in 1766 and was called to the bar in 1771. He was Treasurer of the Inner Temple from 19 November 1813 to 17 November 1814 and his monogram can be seen above the doorways of Nos. 10 and 11 King's Bench Walk.

In 1779 Hippisley travelled to Italy where he became the British government's man in Rome.  He married his first wife Margaret Stuart in Rome in February 1780.  Margaret was the second daughter of Sir John Stuart, third Baronet of Allanbank. They had four children together – Margaret Frances, born 1780; Windhamina Barbara (probably named after Hippisley's friend William Windham), born 1787; John Stuart, born 1790, and Louisa Anne.

In 1781 Hippisley secured an appointment with the East India Company and moved to Madras, eventually becoming paymaster in Tanjore. He resigned from the Company in 1787 and returned to England in 1789.  In the following year he was returned as Member of Parliament (MP) for Sudbury.  At the general elections of 1796 and 1801 he was not returned to Parliament, but he was successful in 1802 and retained his seat until 1818 when he retired from the House of Commons.

In 1792 Hippisley returned to Italy and remained there until 1795, during which time he served as a semi-official representative of the British Prime Minister William Pitt the Younger at the Court of Pope Pius VI.  Upon returning to England he was called upon to negotiate the marriage between Prince Frederick of Württemberg (later Frederick I of Württemberg) to Charlotte, Princess Royal, eldest daughter of George III. After bringing the negotiations to a successful conclusion, Hippisley finally received his long-sought baronetcy on 10 May 1796

In 1799 the plight of Henry Benedict Stuart, the last representative in the male line of the Royal House of Stuart, was brought to Hippisley's attention by Dr. Stefano Borgia. Cardinal York was living in France, ill and penniless, and Hippisley persuaded George III to award him an annual pension of £4,000.

Second marriage and later years

Hippisley's first wife Margaret died on 24 September 1799 in Brompton, London. In 1800 he served as High Sheriff of Berkshire, where he owned Warfield Grove, a red-brick Georgian mansion which he had bought from Admiral Sir George Bowyer. Hippisley sold the house to the Earl of Mountnorris in the early 19th century. In February 1801 he married his second wife, Elizabeth Anne Coxe (née Horner), the widow of Henry Hippisley Coxe (1748-1795) of Ston Easton Park, Somerset, MP for Somerset (1792-5).  Despite the similarity of their names, John was not closely related to the Hippisleys of Ston Easton, if at all.  He may have changed the spelling of his name around this time to further legitimise his position at Ston Easton.

Hippisley was a Fellow of the Royal Society, a vice-president and supporter of the Literary Fund Society, a benefactor of Downside Abbey, one of the principal promoters of the literary institutions of Bath and Bristol, a member of the government committee of the Turkey Company, vice-president of the West of England Agricultural Society and a member of the Society of Antiquarians. He was however not a popular man with all his contemporaries.  The Rev. John Skinner referred to him as 'that great orator' and a 'great ass' in his diary, published as The Journal of a Somerset Rector, while in 1810 the wit and politician Joseph Jekyll described how during a speech by Hippisley in parliament 'the house coughed him down five times in vain, and the catarrh lasted two hours'.

Hippisley had no children with Elizabeth.  He retired from political life in 1818 and died on 3 May 1825 in Grosvenor Street, London.  He was buried in the Inner Temple vault on 12 May 1825. His monument was sculpted by William Grinsell Nicholl.

His widow Elizabeth died on 25 March 1843 in Grosvenor Square, London, whereupon the Ston Easton estate was inherited by her grandnephew, John Hippisley.  Sir John was succeeded as baronet by John Stuart Hippisley, his son by his first wife, but he died unmarried in Mells, Somerset on 20 March 1867, whereupon the baronetcy became extinct.

References

 Some Notes on the Hippisley Family, A. E. Hippisley & I. FitzRoy Jones (Eds), Wessex Press 1952
  The Oxford Dictionary of National Biography, Oxford University Press
 Sir John Coxe Hippisley: That 'Busy Man' in the Cause of Catholic Emancipation, Susan Mitchell Sommers, Parliamentary History, February 2008

External links
Caricature of Sir John Coxe Hippisley in the National Portrait Gallery's collection

Detailed biography of Sir John Coxe Hippisley
 

1746 births
1825 deaths
People from Warfield
Politicians from Bristol
People educated at Bristol Grammar School
Alumni of Hertford College, Oxford
Baronets in the Baronetage of Great Britain
British MPs 1790–1796
Fellows of the Royal Society
Fellows of the Society of Antiquaries of London
Members of the Inner Temple
Members of the Parliament of Great Britain for English constituencies
Members of the Parliament of the United Kingdom for English constituencies
High Sheriffs of Berkshire
UK MPs 1802–1806
UK MPs 1806–1807
UK MPs 1807–1812
UK MPs 1812–1818